Joel David Graterol Nader (born 13 February 1997) is a Venezuelan professional footballer who plays as a goalkeeper for Greek Super League club Panetolikos.

International career
Graterol was called up to the Venezuela under-20 side for the 2017 FIFA U-20 World Cup. He represented the senior Venezuela national team in a 3–1 2022 FIFA World Cup qualification loss to Bolivia on 3 June 2021.

Career statistics

Club

Notes

Honours

Club
Zamora
Venezuelan Primera División: 2018
Copa Venezuela: 2019
América de Cali
Categoria Primera A: 2020

International
Venezuela U-20
FIFA U-20 World Cup: Runner-up 2017
South American Youth Football Championship: Third Place 2017

References

External links

1997 births
Living people
Venezuelan footballers
Venezuela international footballers
Venezuela under-20 international footballers
Association football goalkeepers
Venezuelan Primera División players
Categoría Primera A players
Zamora FC players
Carabobo F.C. players
América de Cali footballers
2021 Copa América players
Venezuelan expatriate footballers
Expatriate footballers in Colombia
Sportspeople from Valencia, Venezuela
21st-century Venezuelan people